Denniston Creek is a  coastal stream in western San Mateo County, California. Denniston Creek rises on the western slopes of Montara Mountain and discharges to the Pacific Ocean at Pillar Point Harbor somewhat north of El Granada Beach.  The watershed of Denniston Creek is made up of relatively permeable sandy soils capable of significant recharge to its aquifers, which supply a moderate amount of  potable water to the local area.

Groundwater
In the headwaters reach high on Montara Mountain, coarse grained decomposed granite overlies heavily fractured granitic based bedrock aquifers.  This upper pocket groundwater complex feeds down-basin alluvial fan deposits on the coastal plain.  These alluvial fans exhibit some characteristics of a confined aquifer, but also respond to pressure and recharge from precipitation.

Mouth
At the mouth of Denniston Creek, the stream cuts through a gently sloping marine terrace plain of alluvium.  In a 1980s biological survey, sightings of the endangered San Francisco garter snake were made.  Denniston Creek is within the domain of the  San Mateo County Local Coastal Plan

See also
Arroyo de en Medio
List of watercourses in the San Francisco Bay Area
Rare species
Riparian zone

References

Rivers of San Mateo County, California
Rivers of Northern California